Robert Ingham (1793 – 21 October 1875) was a British barrister and politician.

The fourth son of the surgeon William Ingham and his wife Jane Walker, of Newcastle upon Tyne, Ingham was educated at Harrow School. He matriculated at Oriel College, Oxford in 1811. He graduated with a B.A. in 1815 and an M.A. in 1818, and held a fellowship at Oriel from 1816 until 1826.

Ingham took to the law and was admitted to Lincoln's Inn on 16 June 1820, moving to the Inner Temple in 1825. He was returned as Member of Parliament (MP) for South Shields in the election of 1832, initially as a Tory. One of his strongest supporters in Shields was local heroine Dolly Peel. He continued to represent South Shields until he was defeated by John Twizell Wawn in the election of 1841. He was also appointed recorder of Berwick-upon-Tweed in June 1832.

In 1846, he was appointed Attorney-General of Durham. In 1850, he became a bencher of the Inner Temple. When Wawn retired in 1852, Ingham beat Henry Liddell in the 1852 election to regain his seat, this time as a Whig. Ingham resigned his attorney-generalship in 1861, and served as reader of the Inner Temple in 1862 and treasurer in 1863. He stood down at the 1868 election, and resigned the recordership of Berwick in 1870. He died in Westoe five years later.

References

External links

External links 
 

1793 births
1875 deaths
Alumni of Oriel College, Oxford
Conservative Party (UK) MPs for English constituencies
19th-century English judges
Fellows of Oriel College, Oxford
Liberal Party (UK) MPs for English constituencies
Members of Lincoln's Inn
Members of the Inner Temple
Tory MPs (pre-1834)
UK MPs 1832–1835
UK MPs 1835–1837
UK MPs 1837–1841
UK MPs 1852–1857
UK MPs 1857–1859
UK MPs 1859–1865
UK MPs 1865–1868
Whig (British political party) MPs for English constituencies
People educated at Harrow School